Ali Sürmeli (born 7 April 1959) is a Turkish  actor, born in Solhan, Bingöl, Turkey.

Filmography

Film 
 1983: Beyaz Ölüm
 1988: Dönüş
 1988: Gece Dansı Tutsakları
 1993: Hoş Memo
 1993: Mavi Sürgün
 1994: Babam Askerde
 1995: Düş, Gerçek, Bir de Sinema
 1995: Sokaktaki Adam
 1996: Hayat Bazen Tatlıdır
 1998: Kaçıklık Diploması
 1998: Karışık Pizza
 2000: Filler ve Çimen
 2001: Şellale
 2001: Son
 2006: Eve Giden Yol
 2006: Sınav
 2006: Umut Adası
 2007: Beyaz Melek
 2007: Fırtına
 2008: Girdap
 2008: Hoşçakal Güzin
 2009: Güneşi Gördüm
 2009: Kolpaçino
 2010: New York'ta Beş Minare
 2010: Takiye:Allah Yolunda
 2012: Açlığa Doymak
 2012: Birses Böler Geceyi
 2014: Mucize
 2016: Babaların Babası
 2017: Vezir Parmağı
 2019: Hep Yek 3
 2019: Mucize 2: Aşk
 2021: Seni Bulacam Oğlum!
 2022: Sivasliyih Gardas
 2023: Prestij Meselesi

Television 
 1992: Umut Taksi
 1994: Kurtuluş
 1996: Olacak O Kadar
 1999: Deli Yürek
 2003: Hürrem Sultan
 2003: Kasabanın İncisi
 2004: Büyük Buluşma
 2004: Şeytan Ayrıntıda Gizlidir
 2005: Kin ve Gül
 2006: Aşka Sürgün
 2006: Yağmurdan Sonra
 2007: Kuzey Rüzgarı
 2007: Senin Uğruna
 2008: Baba Ocağı
 2009: Kurtlar Vadisi Pusu
 2012: Kurt Kanunu
 2014: Beyaz Karanfil
 2019: Çarpışma
 2019: Çukur - guest appearance
 2020: Eşkıya Dünyaya Hükümdar Olmaz
 2023: Adım Farah

Awards 
 1996: 8th Ankara International Film Festival - Best Supporting Actor - Sokaktaki Adam
 1996: 18th SİYAD Turkish Cinema Awards - Best Supporting Actor - Sokaktaki Adam
 2000: 37th Golden Orange Film Festival - Best Supporting Actor - Filler ve Çimen

References

External links
 Official website
 

1959 births
Living people
People from Solhan,_Bingöl
Turkish people of Kurdish descent
Kurdish male_actors
Turkish male film actors
Turkish male television actors